Ashraf Mohamed (born 30 July 1962) is an Egyptian weightlifter. He competed in the men's heavyweight II event at the 1984 Summer Olympics.

References

1962 births
Living people
Egyptian male weightlifters
Olympic weightlifters of Egypt
Weightlifters at the 1984 Summer Olympics
Place of birth missing (living people)